The Kharoṣṭhī script, also spelled Kharoshthi, was an ancient Indo-Iranian script used by various Aryan peoples in north-western regions of the Indian subcontinent, more precisely around present-day northern Pakistan and eastern Afghanistan. It was used in Central Asia as well. An abugida, it was introduced at least by the middle of the 3rd century BCE, possibly during the 4th century BCE, and remained in use until it died out in its homeland around the 3rd century CE.

It was also in use in Bactria, the Kushan Empire, Sogdia, and along the Silk Road. There is some evidence it may have survived until the 7th century in Khotan and Niya, both cities in East Turkestan.

Form

Kharosthi (from right to left Kha-ro-ṣṭhī) is mostly written right to left (type A).

Each syllable includes the short /a/ sound by default, with other vowels being indicated by diacritic marks. Recent epigraphic evidence has shown that the order of letters in the Kharosthi script follows what has become known as the Arapacana alphabet. As preserved in Sanskrit documents, the alphabet runs:

a ra pa ca na la da ba ḍa ṣa va ta ya ṣṭa ka sa ma ga stha ja śva dha śa kha kṣa sta jñā rtha (or ha) bha cha sma hva tsa gha ṭha ṇa pha ska ysa śca ṭa ḍha

Some variations in both the number and order of syllables occur in extant texts.

Kharosthi includes only one standalone vowel which is used for initial vowels in words. Other initial vowels use the a character modified by diacritics. Using epigraphic evidence, Salomon has established that the vowel order is /a e i o u/, akin to Semitic scripts, rather than the usual vowel order for Indic scripts /a i u e o/. Also, there is no differentiation between long and short vowels in Kharosthi. Both are marked using the same vowel markers.

The alphabet was used in Gandharan Buddhism as a mnemonic for remembering a series of verses on the nature of phenomena. In Tantric Buddhism, the list was incorporated into ritual practices and later became enshrined in mantras.

Vowels

Consonants

There are two special modified forms of these consonants:

Additional marks

Various additional marks are used to modify vowels and consonants:

Punctuation

Nine Kharosthi punctuation marks have been identified:

Numerals
Kharosthi included a set of numerals that are reminiscent of Roman numerals. The system is based on an additive and a multiplicative principle, but does not have the subtractive feature used in the Roman numeral system.

The numerals, like the letters, are written from right to left. There is no zero and no separate signs for the digits 5–9.  Numbers in Kharosthi use an additive system.
For example, the number 1996 would be written as 1000 4 4 1 100 20 20 20 20 10 4 2 (image:  text).

History

The script was earlier also known as "Indo-Bactrian", "Kabul script" and "Arian-Pali". Scholars are not in agreement as to whether the Kharosthi script evolved gradually, or was the deliberate work of a single inventor. An analysis of the script forms shows a clear dependency on the Aramaic alphabet but with extensive modifications.

Kharosthi seems to be derived from a form of Aramaic used in administrative work during the reign of Darius the Great, rather than the monumental cuneiform used for public inscriptions. The name Kharosthi may derive from the Hebrew kharosheth, a Semitic word for writing, or from Old Iranian *xšaθra-pištra, which means "royal writing".

One model is that the Aramaic script arrived with the Achaemenid conquest of the Indus Valley in 500 BCE and evolved over the next 200+ years to reach its final form by the 3rd century BCE where it appears in some of the Edicts of Ashoka. However, no intermediate forms have yet been found to confirm this evolutionary model, and rock and coin inscriptions from the 3rd century BCE onward show a unified and standard form. An inscription in Aramaic dating back to the 4th century BCE was found in Sirkap, testifying to the presence of the Aramaic script in present-day Pakistan. According to Sir John Marshall, this seems to confirm that Kharoshthi was later developed from Aramaic.

The study of the Kharosthi script was recently invigorated by the discovery of the Gandhāran Buddhist texts, a set of birch bark manuscripts written in Kharosthi, discovered near the Afghan city of Hadda just west of the Khyber Pass in Pakistan. The manuscripts were donated to the British Library in 1994. The entire set of British Library manuscripts are dated to the 1st century CE, although other collections from different institutions contain Kharosthi manuscripts from 1st century BCE to 3rd century CE, making them the oldest Buddhist manuscripts yet discovered.

While the derived Brahmi scripts remained in use for centuries, Kharosthi seems to have been abandoned after the 2nd-3rd Century AD. Because of the substantial differences between the Semitic-derived Kharosthi script and its successors, knowledge of Kharosthi may have declined rapidly once the script was supplanted by Brahmi-derived scripts, until its re-discovery by Western scholars in the 19th Century.

The Kharosthi script was deciphered separately almost concomitantly by James Prinsep (in 1835, published in the Journal of the Asiatic society of Bengal, India) and by Carl Ludwig Grotefend (in 1836, published in Blatter fur Munzkunde, Germany), with Grotenfend "evidently not aware" of Prinsep's article, followed by Christian Lassen (1838). They all used the bilingual coins of the Indo-Greek Kingdom (obverse in Greek, reverse in Pali, using the Kharosthi script). This in turn led to the reading of the Edicts of Ashoka, some of which were written in the Kharosthi script (the Major Rock Edicts at Mansehra and Shahbazgarhi).

Unicode

Kharosthi was added to the Unicode Standard in March, 2005 with the release of version 4.1.

The Unicode block for Kharosthi is U+10A00–U+10A5F:

Gallery

See also
Brahmi
History of Afghanistan
History of Pakistan
Pre-Islamic scripts in Afghanistan

Further reading

Kaschgar und die Kharoṣṭhī (1903)

References

Further reading
Dani, Ahmad Hassan. Kharoshthi Primer, Lahore Museum Publication Series - 16, Lahore, 1979
Falk, Harry. Schrift im alten Indien: Ein Forschungsbericht mit Anmerkungen, Gunter Narr Verlag, 1993 (in German)
Fussman's, Gérard. Les premiers systèmes d'écriture en Inde, in Annuaire du Collège de France 1988-1989 (in French)
Hinüber, Oscar von. Der Beginn der Schrift und frühe Schriftlichkeit in Indien, Franz Steiner Verlag, 1990 (in German)
Nasim Khan, M.(1997).	Ashokan Inscriptions: A Palaeographical Study. Atthariyyat (Archaeology), Vol. I, pp. 131–150. Peshawar
Nasim Khan, M.(1999). Two Dated Kharoshthi Inscriptions from Gandhara. Journal of Asian Civilizations (Journal of Central Asia), Vol. XXII, No.1, July 1999: 99-103.
Nasim Khan, M.(2000).  An Inscribed Relic-Casket from Dir. The Journal of Humanities and Social Sciences, Vol. V, No. 1, March 1997: 21–33. Peshawar
Nasim Khan, M.(2000). Kharoshthi Inscription from Swabi - Gandhara. The Journal of Humanities and Social Sciences, Vol. V, No. 2. September 1997: 49–52. Peshawar.
Nasim Khan, M.(2004). Kharoshthi Manuscripts from Gandhara. Journal of Humanities and Social Sciences. Vol. XII, Nos. 1 & 2 (2004): 9-15. Peshawar
Nasim Khan, M.(2009). Kharoshthi Manuscripts from Gandhara (2nd ed.. First published in 2008.

External links
Gandhari.org Catalog and Corpus of all known Kharoṣṭhī (Gāndhārī) texts
Indoskript 2.0, a paleographic database of Brahmi and Kharosthi
A Preliminary Study of Kharoṣṭhī Manuscript Paleography by Andrew Glass, University of Washington (2000)

Ancient history of Afghanistan
Obsolete writing systems
Ancient history of Pakistan
Abugida writing systems
Right-to-left writing systems